The Lost Honour of Christopher Jefferies is a 2014 British television film. It tells the real-life story of retired schoolteacher Christopher Jefferies, who was questioned by police as a suspect in the murder of Joanna Yeates. He was vilified by the press, partly because of his eccentric appearance, even after he had been released on bail by the police.

The film was directed by Roger Michell, written by Peter Morgan, and stars Jason Watkins as Jefferies. The title is taken from The Lost Honour of Katharina Blum by Heinrich Böll, a fictional account of media defamation.

Plot
The drama begins the day before Yeates’ disappearance, and follows the innocent Jefferies through his arrest, release and subsequent isolation as his un-sought fame profoundly affects his life. Five weeks later the real killer, neighbour Vincent Tabak, is finally arrested. Jefferies later gives evidence at the Leveson inquiry into the News of the World phone hacking scandal.

Cast
 Jason Watkins as Christopher Jefferies
 Shaun Parkes as Paul Okebu
 Ben Caplan as Charles Chapman
 Nathalie Armin as Melissa Chapman
 Joe Sims as Vincent Tabak
 Jennifer Higham as Tanja
 Matthew Barker as Greg Reardon
 Carla Turner as Joanna Yeates
 Peter Polycarpou as Louis Charalambous 
 Anna Maxwell Martin as Janine
 Colin Mace as Peter Stanley
 Steve Coogan as himself (uncredited)

Production
The screenplay was written by Peter Morgan. The Bristol Post reported that Jefferies had read and approved the script, and supported the project.
The drama was produced by Carnival Films and Television and aired on 10 and 11 December 2014 on ITV.

Critical reception
In May 2015, it won two awards at the 2015 British Academy Television Awards—best mini-series for the programme itself and best actor for Watkins's portrayal of Jefferies.

In 2016 it won two awards at the RTS Awards for Craft in Drama: Best Editing and Sound Fiction.

References

External links

2014 British television series debuts
2014 British television series endings
2010s British crime drama television series
ITV television dramas
2010s British television miniseries
English-language television shows
Television shows shot in Bristol